Sargassum natans is a species of Sargassum.

In English the species goes by the common names common gulfweed, narrowleaf gulfweed, or spiny gulfweed.

It occurs in the Sargasso Sea. It is also pelagic and reproduces by fragmentation.

References 

Fucales